Vuelta Ciclista a León, also known as La Vuelta León, is a former road bicycle race held annually in the province of León in Spain. From 2005 until 2013 it was organised as a 2.2 event on the professional UCI Europe Tour. The other editions were amateur races.

Winners

UCI Europe Tour races
Recurring sporting events established in 2001
2001 establishments in Spain
Leon
Cycle races in Castile and León